Rosières may refer:

Places in France
 Rosières, Ardèche, a commune in the department of Ardèche
 Rosières, Haute-Loire, a commune in the department of Haute-Loire
 Rosières, Oise, a commune in the department of Oise
 Rosières, Tarn, a commune in the department of Tarn
 Rosières-aux-Salines, a commune in the department of Meurthe-et-Moselle
 Rosières-en-Haye, a commune in the department of Meurthe-et-Moselle
 Rosières-en-Santerre, a commune in the department of Somme
 Rosières-près-Troyes, a commune in the department of Aube
 Rosières-sur-Barbèche, a commune in the department of Doubs
 Rosières-sur-Mance, a commune in the department of Haute-Saône
 Sars-et-Rosières, a commune in the department of Nord

Other uses
 Battle of Rosières, World War I
 , a French appliance brand owned by Candy

See also
 La Rosière (disambiguation)